Glen Echo may refer to:

Australia 
 Glen Echo, Queensland, a locality in the Gympie Region, Queensland, Australia

Canada 
 Glen Echo Park, Ontario, a former nudist park in Southern Ontario, Canada
 Glen Echo Road, a residential road located in the Teddington Park area of North York, Ontario
 Glen Echo Terminal, Carhouse and Loop, a former terminus for the Metropolitan radial line, Toronto

United States 
 Glen Echo, Colorado
Glen Echo (Ellabelle, Georgia), listed on the NRHP in Bryan County, Georgia
 Glen Echo, Maryland
Glen Echo Park (Maryland), former amusement park
Glen Echo Park, Missouri
Glen Echo, Columbus, Ohio, NRHP-listed
Glen Echo (Franklin, Tennessee), listed on the NRHP in Williamson County, Tennessee